A cycloid is a curve traced by a rolling circle. "Cycloid" can also refer to:
Cyclida (formerly Cycloidea), an order of prehistoric crustaceans
Cycloid scale, a type of scale seen on some fishes
Cycloid-β and Cycloid-γ, characters in the Street Fighter games